Dunlop hill is a hill in Dunlop, East Ayrshire which is believed to have once held a Celtic fortress. Unknown in age, it is probably a few thousand years old. For members of the Dunlop family, it is a legend that has been believed for centuries.

External links 
 Clan Dunlop

Mountains and hills of East Ayrshire